Daren Streblow (born on January 5, 1971) is an American stand-up comedian and radio show host originally from Ely, Minnesota. He is most noted for his clean, observational humor.

Style
Daren Streblow performs mostly observational comedy, referencing to everyday subjects for parts of his routine. He has opened for "Weird Al" Yankovic, James Gregory, and Brad Stine.
His subjects are usually about everyday life and what he sees as awkward parts of society, such as waterslides being "torture." His nerdy offbeat style has earned him the title "The King Of Uncool". He refrains from swearing and using sexual innuendo in his routines, drawing inspiration from everyday life in the style of Brian Regan and Jerry Seinfeld, though more akin to Brad Stine, as he styles his comedy as a unique style of observational stand-up comedy. 
Streblow considers himself an "Outreach Comedian," though his acts do not normally feature topics about his religion.

Career 
Originally a radio show host, Streblow stepped down to become a full-time comedian in 1998. Streblow has toured the United States with Gotee Records recording artist Jeff Anderson and comedian David Phelps, in which Bill Dana attended. He also performed between bands on both nights of the 2007 Rock the Universe, a Christian rock festival in Universal Studios Florida.
He regularly tours in the U.S. and continues to host his syndicated radio program, The Daren Streblow Comedy Show. His comedy performances have grown to reach 60 markets internationally.

Streblow has been featured in numerous comedy stand-up films and TV shows including Ken Davis and Friends: Lighten Up and Laugh!, Bananas, Bananas Season 1 and Thou Shalt Laugh 5.
Daren's syndicated radio program, The Daren Streblow Comedy Show airs on over 60 stations and regularly includes well-known comedians such as Tim Hawkins and Frank Caliendo.

Personal life
Streblow is a Christian and is frequently booked for his squeaky-clean comedy in large churches and youth organizations, though he refrains from "preaching" in routines. It is unknown if he refers to his comedy as "Christian Comedy," though he is a member of Outreach Comedy. He has stated that "if you bring God with you... people notice and people will ask questions... just be faithful."
He lives in Cloquet, Minnesota with his wife and children.

Filmography 
 2005 Bananas
 2005 Bananas Season One
 Ken Davis and Friends: Lighten Up and Laugh!
 2006 Thou Shalt Laugh

References

External links
 Official Website

1971 births
Living people
People from Ely, Minnesota
American Christians
American stand-up comedians
21st-century American comedians